Pedro Alberto Benito Ponomar (born 27 March 2000) is a Spanish footballer who plays as a forward for UD San Sebastián de los Reyes.

Club career
Born in Cádiz, Andalusia, Benito represented RCN El Puerto de Santa María, UD Pavía (two stints), UD Almería (two stints), Swansea City, Anorthosis Famagusta FC and CD Canillas as a youth. In January 2018, after already making his senior debut with Pavía's first team in the regional leagues, he moved to the United States after accepting a Business Administration and Sport Management degree at the Oklahoma Wesleyan University.

After spending the 2018 season with Oklahoma Wesleyan Eagles, Benito played the 2019 campaign for the Gardner–Webb University's Runnin' Bulldogs side. He returned to his home country in 2020, after joining UCAM Murcia CF's reserves in Tercera División.

On 27 May 2021, Benito signed a two-year deal with Cádiz CF, being initially assigned to the B-team in Segunda División RFEF. He made his first team – and La Liga – debut on 2 October, coming on as a second-half substitute for Álvaro Negredo in a 0–0 home draw against Valencia CF.

On 30 November 2021, Benito was loaned to Primera División RFEF side San Fernando CD for the remainder of the season, effective as of the following January. On 2 July 2022, he signed for fellow third division side UD San Sebastián de los Reyes.

Personal life
Benito's father Alberto was also a footballer. A midfielder, he also played for Cádiz.

A supporter of Cádiz, Benito is also a well-known personality on TikTok, having more than one million followers on his account.

References

External links
 
 
 

2000 births
Living people
Footballers from Cádiz
Spanish footballers
Association football forwards
La Liga players
Primera Federación players
Segunda División B players
Segunda Federación players
Tercera División players
Divisiones Regionales de Fútbol players
UCAM Murcia CF B players
Cádiz CF B players
Cádiz CF players
San Fernando CD players
UD San Sebastián de los Reyes players
Oklahoma Wesleyan Eagles soccer players
Spanish expatriate footballers
Spanish expatriate sportspeople in Wales
Spanish expatriate sportspeople in the United States
Expatriate footballers in Wales
Expatriate soccer players in the United States